Greene High School may refer to:

 Eastern Greene High School, Greene County, Indiana
 Greene Central High School, Greene County, North Carolina
 Greene High School (New York), Greene, New York
 South Greene High School, Greeneville, Tennessee
 North Greene High School, Greene County, Tennessee
 West Greene High School (Pennsylvania), Greene County, Pennsylvania
 West Greene High School (Tennessee),  Mosheim, Tennessee

See also
 Green High School (disambiguation)